Michael Elliot Kwabena Okyere Darko popularly known as Obrafour, other names include Rap Executioner  and Rap Sofo (born  1976) is a Ghanaian hiplife musician and rapper. Obrafour has a unique style of Twi rapping and storytelling. His popular and hit debut album "Pae mu ka", for which he won 3 awards during the 2000 edition of Ghana Music Awards is arguably one of the best selling albums in Ghana. In May 2019, Obrafour celebrated the 20th anniversary of the "Pae mu ka" album.

Early life 
Obrafour was born in Obo Kwahu to a chorister mother by name  Mrs. Gladys Agyapomaa and Mr. Kwaku Okyere Darko. He wanted to become a lawyer which failed after his mother's death. This was in 1995 after one term at St. Peter's Boys Senior High School when as he was preparing for his A levels. He had his basic education at New Star  Preparatory School and proceeded to Abetifi Secondary before getting into St. Peter's Boys Senior High School. At a very young age, he would perform with his mother in church  and has celebrated the role of motherhood throughout his career.

Music career 
His musical influence came from his mother. While in high school, he put together a quartet that sang gospel songs. Later on Quincy a friend of Obrafour's who could rap, introduced him to the art. He attended auditions and performance sessions and met Hammer who was then an amateur beat maker. Hammer facilitated a deal between Obrafour and Abraham Ohene Djan (OM Studios) and in the latter part of 1999, Pae Mu Ka, his debut album was released. On November 9, 2019, he commemorated the 20th anniversary of the album at the 'Pae Mu Ka' concert at the Accra Intentional Conference  Centre.

Discography 
 Pae Mu Ka (1999)
 Asem Sebe (2001)
 Tofa (2005)
 Asem Beba Dabi
 Heavy (2006)
 Nte Tee Pa (2003)
 Yaanom
 Maame
 Kwame Nkrumah
 Kasiebo
 Still Strong(2018)
 Love Anthem(2018)
 Adom Bi(2019)

Awards and nominations

Ghana Music Awards 

!Ref
|-
|rowspan="3"|2000
|Himself
|Rapper of the Year
|
|rowspan="3"|
|-
|Himself
|New Artiste of the Year
|
|-
|"Pae mu ka"
|Hiplife song of the Year
|

Ghana Music Awards UK 

!Ref
|-
|2004
|"Ntete Pa"
|Album of the Year
|
|

References

Relevant liteature 
Oduro-Frimpong, Joseph. "The Pleasure(s) of Proverb Discourse in Contemporary Popular Ghanaian Music: The Case of Obrafour’s Hiplife Songs." Being and Becoming African as a Permanent Work in Progress: Inspiration from Chinua Achebe's Proverbs, edited by Franics B. Nyamnjoh, Patrick Nwosu, and Hassan M. Yoimbom. Bamenda, Cameroon: Langaa Research and Publishing. (2021): 259-280.

Living people
Ghanaian rappers
1976 births